Golmarz may refer to:
 Shahrak-e Golmarz